Phoenix is a 1998 American neo-noir crime film directed by British director Danny Cannon and starring Ray Liotta.  Liotta plays a cop whose gambling debt leaves him indebted to the underworld and desperate to find a way out without compromising his principles.

Plot
In Phoenix, Arizona, Harry Collins is a cop whose compulsive gambling has indebted him to a local gangster, Chicago.  As his losses mount and time counts down, Collins resorts to exploiting a young woman, Veronica, that he has picked up to distract his friends in a poker game.  Despite the successful distraction, he still loses, and he rejects Veronica's sexual advances, as he considers her to be bad luck.  When Collins drops her off at her house, Veronica's mother sees her daughter in tears and glares at Collins.  Collins later tracks down Veronica's mother, Leila, and defends himself, stating that he did not have sex with her.  Unimpressed, Leila rebukes him, which causes him to reassess his behavior and offer a sincere apology.  Surprised by his apology, Leila slowly warms to Collins, and they begin a romance.  Having lost his lucky lighter, Collins asks her for a keepsake, but Leila tells him that he must make his own luck and avoid whatever trouble in which he's become involved.

Meanwhile, Chicago cuts off Collins from his bookies and gives him 48 hours to either repay his debt or murder Joey, a young suspect held in custody.  Mike Henshaw, Collins' corrupt partner, suggests murdering Chicago, but Collins, unwilling to welch on a bet or murder Joey, decides instead to rob Louie, a local loanshark.  Collins recruits Henshaw and another corrupt cop, James Nutter, and, over their objections, brings in a more strait-laced cop, Fred Shuster.  Unknown to the others, Shuster has discovered that his wife, Katie, is having an affair with Henshaw.  Distraught and feeling betrayed, Shuster agrees to work with Lt. Webber to bring down the corrupt cops.  However, the robbery is botched when the trigger-happy Henshaw kills Louie before he can open the safe.  Collins hires a local locksmith to crack Louie's safe, and the group splits up.  Collins and Shuster arrive at the meeting point, but Lt. Webber is already there; Webber betrays Shuster, killing him, and shoots Collins in the gut.  Collins escapes, but Webber steals the money.

Nutter and Henshaw, suspecting that Collins has betrayed them, arrive at the meeting point and discover Shuster's body.  Before they can track down Collins and kill him, they are surrounded by the police.  When Nutter attempts to surrender, Henshaw kills him; Henshaw is killed in turn by the other cops.  Collins hitches a ride back to town and surprises Katie and Webber, who are having an affair.  Over their objections, Collins burns most of the money while denouncing them both for betraying Fred.  After alerting the cops to Webber's involvement, Collins takes enough money to pay off his gambling debt and meets with Chicago.  Amused, Chicago accepts the money but mocks Collins' reluctance to murder Joey; Chicago reveals that he has had Joey murdered in prison and points out that had Collins simply murdered Joey, all of this trouble could have been avoided.  Enraged, Collins kills Chicago and his bodyguards, then stumbles back to his car, where he apparently dies of his wounds.

Cast
 Ray Liotta as Detective Harry Collins
 Anthony LaPaglia as Detective Mike Henshaw
 Anjelica Huston as Leila
 Daniel Baldwin as Detective James Nutter
 Jeremy Piven as Detective Fred Shuster
 George Aguilar as "Mr. Fat"
 Tom Noonan as "Chicago"
 Xander Berkeley as Lieutenant Clyde Webber
 Al Sapienza as cop
 Giancarlo Esposito as Louie
 Brittany Murphy as Veronica
 Kari Wührer as Katie Shuster
 Giovanni Ribisi as Joey Schneider
 Royce D. Applegate as Detective Dickerman

Reception
Rotten Tomatoes, a review aggregator, reports that 50% of six surveyed critics gave the film a positive review; the average rating was 5.5/10.  Lawrence Van Gelder, writing in The New York Times, stated that "character and conversation outweigh momentum and suspense in Phoenix but a gifted cast [...] splashes alluring color across its familiar noir".  Kevin Thomas of the Los Angeles Times described the film as "a terrific neo-noir".  In a negative review, Leonard Klady of Variety called the film "largely tiresome and uninspired", more suited to pay cable.

Soundtrack
 "Ama" (written by Daniel Riddle and David Parks) performed by Hitting Birth
 "11 O'Clock" (Mark Sandman) by Morphine
 "Dogs of Lust (Germicide Mix)" (Matt Johnson) by The The
 "K. C. " (Guy Davis, Marc Olson, and Mike Williamson) by Sage
 "Terrified" (Hubert Clifford) by Hubert Clifford
 "Tragedy" (Clive Richardson) by Clive Richardson
 "Mas y Mas" (David Hidalgo and Louis Perez) by Los Lobos
 "Terraplane Blues" (Robert Johnson) by Robert Johnson
 "Untitled #1" (Josh Haden) by Spain
 "I Can't Win" (Leonard Johnson, Dave Richardson, and Cliff Knight) by Ry Cooder
 "From Four Until Late" (Robert Johnson) by Robert Johnson
 "Until Tomorrow" (Graeme Revell, Danny Cannon, and Gail Ann Dorsey) by Gail Ann Dorsey

References

External links 
 
 
 

1998 films
American neo-noir films
Films about organized crime in the United States
1998 crime drama films
Films directed by Danny Cannon
Films set in Phoenix, Arizona
Films scored by Graeme Revell
Money lenders
1990s English-language films
1990s American films